The Jets were a Dutch pop group of the 1960s from Utrecht.

Members 
Peter van Meel (zang)
Nico Witkamp (zang, basgitaar)
Barry van der Berg (gitaar)
Leen van der Werf (slaggitaar)
Eddy Geurtsen (toetsinstrumenten, zang)
Boy Brotowksi (drums)
Karry Mulder (basgitaar, overleden 2000)
Tonny Mulder (drums)

Discography

Singles
1964: Shake hands/Memphis, Tennessee, alleen verkrijgbaar bij botermerk Leeuwenzegel.
1964: Jets fly/Baby Elephant Walk
1965: Jets versie van Goldfinger (werd ook uitgebracht in Japan, maar dan onder artiestennaam The Goldfingers)
1965: Thunderball
1966: Do the monkey with James Bond
1966: I was so glad
1966: The pied piper
1966: If I could start my life again
1966: Please send me a letter
1988: Solide

Albums
1966: Caravan
1966: Goldfinger
1966: Santa Claus a Go Go
1983: The Jets Live

References

Dutch musical groups